Elizabeth Yake is a Canadian film producer, who is the founder and president of True West Films. She is most noted for the films Everything's Gone Green and It's All Gone Pete Tong, the latter of which won the Toronto International Film Festival Award for Best Canadian Film in 2004 and was a Genie Award nominee for Canadian Screen Award for Best Motion Picture at the 26th Genie Awards in 2006.

Education 
Yake was educated at the University of Guelph, Ryerson University and Regent's University London. She has also studied at the Canadian Film Centre.

Career 
Yake's dramatic films include The Feeler, Shoemaker, Desire, Mile Zero, Miss Texas, It's All Gone Pete Tong and Everything's Gone Green. Her documentaries include Hadwin's Judgement, Jeff Wall: In Order to Make a Picture, bp: pushing the boundaries, The Dragon's Egg, Mémoire Moire des souvenirs and Out of the Woods'''.

She was nominated for the Donald Brittain Award in 1999 for The Dragon's Egg.

In 2005 she won the Leo Award, Best Feature Length Drama for It's All Gone Pete Tong and again in 2007 for Everything's Gone Green.It's All Gone Pete Tong was voted by Playback one of the ten best films of the 2000s, was nominated for Best Achievement in Production Award at the British Independent Film Awards, Best Actor and Best Feature at the HBO US Comedy Festival (Aspen), winner of the Audience Award and Best Feature Award at the Gen Arts Film Festival in New York.

Awards & nominations

 2016, Nominated for Canadian Screen Award for Ted Rogers Best Feature Length Documentary for Hadwin's Judgement
 2015, Won Sharon Gibbon Award from Vancouver Women in Film & Television Spotlight Awards

References

External links 
 

Living people
Year of birth missing (living people)
Canadian documentary film producers
Canadian women film producers
University of Guelph alumni
Toronto Metropolitan University alumni
Canadian Film Centre alumni
Canadian women documentary filmmakers